Mother London (1988) is a novel by Michael Moorcock. It was shortlisted for the Whitbread Prize.  Although the city of London itself is perhaps the central character, it follows three outpatients from a mental hospital—a music hall artist (Josef Kiss), a reclusive writer (David Mummery) and a woman just awoken from a long coma (Mary Gasalee)—who experience the history of the city from the Blitz to the late eighties through chaotic experience and sensory delusions. The novel is a non-chronological compilation of episodes, snippets and sidelines, rather than a single cohesive narrative. A piece in The Guardian called it 'a great, humane document'.

Michael Moorcock was the editor of New Worlds and gained numerous critical acclaim and media attention.

References

Footnotes

1988 British novels
Novels by Michael Moorcock
Novels set in London
Secker & Warburg books